Stephen Hunt may refer to:
Stephen Hunt (footballer, born 1981), Republic of Ireland footballer 
Stephen Hunt (footballer, born 1984), English footballer 
Stephen Hunt (author) (born 1966), British author
Stephen J. Hunt, British sociologist
Stephen Hunt (born 1981), Australian actor famous for playing Matt Hancock in Australian soap opera Neighbours
Steve Hunt (born 1958), American jazz pianist
Steve Hunt (footballer, born 1956), England, Coventry, Aston Villa and West Bromwich Albion footballer
Steven Hunt (rugby union) (born 1988), South African rugby sevens player